Psalm 124 is the 124th psalm of the Book of Psalms, beginning in the English of the King James Version: "If it had not been the  who was on our side, now may Israel say". The Book of Psalms is part of the third section of the Hebrew Bible, and a book of the Christian Old Testament. In Latin it is known as "Nisi quia Dominus". It is one of fifteen psalms that begin with the words "A song of ascents" (Shir Hama'alot). Using "conventional metaphors", it recalls the dangers faced by Israel from which the nation has been rescued.

In the slightly different numbering system used in the Greek Septuagint and the Latin Vulgate, this psalm is Psalm 123.

The psalm forms a regular part of Jewish, Catholic, Lutheran, Anglican and other Protestant liturgies. Marc-Antoine Charpentier set the psalm in the 1690s as Nisi quia Dominus erat, H. 217, for soloists, chorus and continuo, and it was paraphrased in two psalm songs by Protestant Reformers which were set as chorale cantatas by Johann Sebastian Bach.

Text

Hebrew Bible version
Following is the Hebrew text of Psalm 124:

King James Version
 If it had not been the LORD who was on our side, now may Israel say;
 If it had not been the LORD who was on our side, when men rose up against us:
 Then they had swallowed us up quick, when their wrath was kindled against us:
 Then the waters had overwhelmed us, the stream had gone over our soul:
 Then the proud waters had gone over our soul.
 Blessed be the LORD, who hath not given us as a prey to their teeth.
 Our soul is escaped as a bird out of the snare of the fowlers: the snare is broken, and we are escaped.
 Our help is in the name of the LORD, who made heaven and earth.

Uses

Judaism 
The psalm is recited following Mincha between Sukkot and Shabbat Hagadol.

Lutheranism 
In 1524, the psalm was paraphrased in German by the Protestant reformers Justus Jonas and Martin Luther. Jonas wrote "Wo Gott der Herr nicht bei uns hält", Luther "Wär Gott nicht mit uns diese Zeit".

Catholic Church
According to the Rule of St Benedict around 530AD, this psalm was traditionally performed for the office of sext from Tuesday to Saturday. In the Liturgy of the Hours, Psalm 124 is currently recited at the Vespers of the Monday of the third week.

It also is the source of the ubiquitous versicle ℣: Our help is in the name of the Lord ℟: who created Heaven and Earth, especially used for introductions of any sort, which is the psalm's verse 8.

Music
In 1694, Michel-Richard de Lalande composed a motet with regard to Psalm 124 (S. 42), for the services of Louis XIV, in the royal chapel of the Chateau of Versailles. Marc-Antoine Charpentier set in 1690s one "Nisi quia Dominus erat in nobis" H.217, for soloists, chorus and continuo.

Many composers wrote chorale preludes for the two hymns.

A setting of the psalm is part of the album Ascents, a collection of setting of Psalms 120-131 written and performed by Dennis Culp in the 1990s, and released in 2000. Psalm 124 is titled "My Help". A setting of the psalm is part of the album Fractures, a collection of psalms settings (16, 60, 68, 134, 34 and 124) by Sons of Korah, and released in 2017. The concluding Psalm 124 is titled "Out of the Snare".

Inscriptions 

The gravestone of the artist Florence St John Cadell bears a line from Psalm 124: "even as a bird out of the fowler's snare".

References

External links 

 
 
 Text of Psalm 124 according to the 1928 Psalter
 Psalms Chapter 124 text in Hebrew and English, mechon-mamre.org
 A song of ascents. Of David. Had not the LORD been with us, let Israel say. text and footnotes, usccb.org United States Conference of Catholic Bishops
 Psalm 124:1 introduction and text, biblestudytools.com
 Psalm 124 – Thanking God for the Help Only He Can Bring enduringword.com
 Psalm 124 / Refrain: Our help is in the name of the Lord. Church of England
 Psalm 124 at biblegateway.com
 Hymns for Psalm 124 hymnary.org

124
Works attributed to David